The Catholic Church in Macau is part of the worldwide Catholic Church, under the spiritual leadership of the Pope in Rome. The history of Catholic church in Macau can traced back to 1576 under the leadership of the Pope. Catholic church in Macau was built not only with the purpose of prayers and atonement but also as rally point for Portuguese to gather up and act as a midway for missionaries going to deeper part of China and south east Asia. The Catholic church within Macau has played an important role on the spread of Catholicism in Japan, Vietnam and China and other parts of south east Asia. The Catholic church in Macau has provided schooling, missionary training and preaching the gospel to the local catholic and non-catholic communities. There are around 30,000 Catholics in Macau (around 5% of the total population), which forms a single diocese, the Diocese of Macau. The current bishop of Macau is Stephen Lee Bun-sang (since 2016).

History 
The Macau Diocese was established in 1576 by Pope Gregory XIII, one of the first diocese created in south East Asia. The earliest diocese in south East Asia, the diocese of Beijing was established in mainland China in the Yuan dynasty in 1307 under the order of Pope Clement V. Then, in 1313, Quanzhou Diocese was established. Despite the vigor of the two dioceses, the work in mainland China has unfortunately stalled due to the lack of missionaries. In early years, the Macau Diocese was the head diocese for major parts of south East Asia, including China, Korea, Japan, Northern Vietnam, and all the islands around South East Asia. Since the establishment of the Macao Diocese, the saints of the Macao Diocese are St. Catherine and St. Francis Xavier of Siena, showing the missionary characteristics of the area In addition to spreading the gospel, the diocese is also responsible for scientific exchanges and research. According to the knowledge and virtue of the papal motto, there is also the responsibility to promote Catholic morality. In addition to the Jesuits, many others established their own institutions in Macau between the 16th and 17th centuries, such as the Franciscans, Augustus, Dominicans, and Sister St. Clair. From the outset, the parish had to obey the appointed colonial leader- the Portuguese Padroado that led to the government over interference in religious affairs and often created friction between the parish and the Portuguese

Connection to different parts of Asia 
The church in colonial  Macau was used by missionaries as a starting point to travel to different parts of Southeast Asia. After a long journey from Europe, the missionaries took Macau as an important rest stop. In addition, Macau has also been used as a base for evangelism in Japan, mainland China and other parts of Southeast Asia. The Franciscans, Dominicans, Augustinians, and the Jesuits have transformed a traditional fishing village into a religious city where named “the City of the Name of God” by King of Portugal John IV in 1640 The pioneer Jesuit to South East Asia Alessandro Valignano, completed most of his establishments in Macau including organizing Jesuit mission to South East Asia and the establishment of a missionary school. In 1594, he founded the St. Paul's College. The college is not only a missionary school, but also a place for cultural and scientific exchanges between Southeast Asia and Europe. The school has been running for nearly two centuries. It was closed in 1762 when the Jesuits were ordered to disband and expelled from the diocese. In 1835, St. Paul Church, a marvelous church that was built next to the college was destroyed because of a fire. The church then be gutted by fire twice and never restored. What remains now is the famous ruins of St. Paul. Its facade has become a symbol of Macau.

Pioneer missionary to mainland China 
In 1583, Michele Ruggieri and Matteo Ricci were dispatched by Alessandro Valignano from Macau to mainland China, trying to reverse the long failing missionary mission. In 1576, Pope Gregory xiii separated Macau from the Malacca and empowered the diocese with jurisdiction over most of South East Asia including Japan, China and the islands close by. The jurisdiction was then shrunk by the erection the diocese in Japan and mainland China, yet these dioceses were short lived. In 1588, the diocese of Funai was established in Japan. In 1690, Beijing and Nanjing dioceses were established in mainland China. In 1710, the imprison papal legate Charles-Thomas Maillard de Tournon died in Macau. After his unsuccessful trip to China trying to settle the controversial conflicts between Chinese traditions and catholic beliefs. The Arrival of Protestant Missionaries. In 1807 the first Protestant missionary arriving in Macau Robert Morrison. His work of translating the Bible into Chinese was a huge boost in promoting Christianity in China. In 1819 the first ever Chinese bible was completed   From the very beginning, Catholic churches opposed the new coming Protestant. Today the Protestant community in Macau remains small.

Now 
After 400 years, the size of the Macau diocese has reduced as different dioceses were established in areas of mainland China yet the numbers of organization and institution set up by the catholic church of Macau have grown and developed. The jurisdiction of the Macao Diocese covers the territory of Macao with 9 parishes. Each parish is led by a Dean nominated by the bishop of Macau. There are a total 31 educational institutions, and 23 social service institutions established and run by different parishes. What's more, it also has a social exchange center, publishing agency and pastoral center for teenagers and elders. There are about 80 priests and brother, 199 sisters in the diocese.

Connection to society 
Catholic Church in Macau has been associated with the ruling class, the Portuguese has also been using Catholic Church to monitor the social situation in Macau since Catholic church in Macau are deeply engaged in the society in return Catholic church in Macau are given different level of privileges and convenience. Therefore created a complex relationship between the Portuguese, Catholic church and the Macau society. Members of the Catholic church have been active on certain issues of social reform: for e.g., Sister Julianna Devoy was an advocate against domestic violence and for legal reform in Macau, the Macau diocese has established drug rehabilitation centers, and Reverend Lancelote M. Rodrigues worked for the rehabilitation of refugees in Macau.

Catholic Schooling 
There are currently 25 high schools, 2 missionary school, 1 university and 1 conservatory run by the Catholic Church in Macau. Most of them are originally established by Catholic church and run until now. The earliest school established is a missionary school in 1594 The St. Paul college. In 1728 the St.Joseph college was established by the Jesuits an attempt to increase the number of missionary. During the stay in the missionary school the trainees has to learn much more only than gospel. Therefore, the St.Paul college and the St Joseph has cultivated the first bunches of bilingual speakers. Added to that the compile of dictionary and the creation of a brand new Chinese-English learning method had laid the foundation of running schools. In modern times Catholic schools are facing different challenges as Catholic church tries implement the rather conservative old fashioned Catholic principle into education against the new generation and the gradually raising open minded society. Added on that  Catholic education in Macau is operating in a city that catholic is no longer the mainstream religion and it has highly commercialized.

See also 
 Catholic Church in China
 Catholic Church in Hong Kong
 Catholic Church in Taiwan
 Religion in Macau

References

External links
 http://www.catholic-hierarchy.org/diocese/dmacu.html

 
Christianity in Macau
Macau
Macau